The 2021 NCAA Division III men's basketball tournament was to have been the tournament hosted by the NCAA to determine the national champion of Division III men's collegiate basketball in the United States for the 2021–22 NCAA Division III men's basketball season. However, the tournament was cancelled due to  an insufficient number of teams participating in Division III.  Only 48.6% of schools participated in men's basketball when 60% was required as schools were in the midst of reopening after the COVID-19 pandemic the previous March.

The championship rounds were scheduled to be played at the Allen County War Memorial Coliseum in Fort Wayne, Indiana.

Despite not having an official championship, D3Sports.com organised a weekly poll for the eight weeks of play.  On March 13, 2021, the Trine Thunder (17-0), which was No. 2 in the D3sports.com poll, traveled to the Randolph-Macon Yellow Jackets (11-0), No. 1 in the same poll, for a game billed as a "postseason bowl game" by organisers.  Randolph-Macon won, 69-55.     The following season, Randolph-Macon repeated their title in 2022, but this time as an official national champion.

See also
 2021 NCAA Division I men's basketball tournament
 2021 NCAA Division II men's basketball tournament
 2021 NAIA men's basketball tournament
 2021 NCAA Division III women's basketball tournament

References

Ncaa Tournament
NCAA Division III men's basketball tournament
2021 in sports in Indiana
NCAA Division III men's basketball tournament, 2021